Andrey Tsurkan (born October 6, 1977 in Luhansk, Ukraine) is a light middleweight boxer from Ukraine.

Pro career
On October 4, 2009 Herrera lost by 10th round T.K.O. to top light middleweight prospect, Mexican Alfredo Angulo. He  is currently an athletic trainer in New York.

References

External links
 "Andrey Tsurkan" at BoxRec

Light-middleweight boxers
1977 births
Living people
Ukrainian male boxers